Sinotaia is a genus of large operculate freshwater snails, aquatic gastropod mollusks in the family Viviparidae.

Distribution
Distribution of the genus Sinotaia include southeast Asia.

Species
Species within the genus Sinotaia include:
 Sinotaia acutecarinata (Yen, 1939)
 Sinotaia aeruginosa (Reeve, 1863)
 Sinotaia angularis (O. F. Müller, 1774)
 Sinotaia annulata (Yen, 1939)
 Sinotaia arturrolli Brandt, 1968
 † Sinotaia barboti (Sinzov, 1884)
 † Sinotaia bugensis (Gozhik in Gozhik & Prysjazhnjuk, 1978)
 Sinotaia datunensis Qian, Fang & He, 2014
 Sinotaia delavayana (Heude, 1890)
 Sinotaia dispiralis (Heude, 1890)
 Sinotaia ecarinata (Kobelt, 1909)
 Sinotaia guangdungensis (Kobelt, 1906)
 Sinotaia limnophila (Mabille, 1886)
 Sinotaia mandahlbarthi Brandt, 1968
 Sinotaia manhongensis (Zhang, Liu & Wang, 1981)
 Sinotaia margaryoides (Annandale, 1924)
 † Sinotaia nicopolis Datsenko, 2001 
 Sinotaia papillapicula (Liu, Zhang & Wang, 1982)
 Sinotaia polyzonata (Frauenfeld, 1862) / Angulyagra polyzonata
 Sinotaia pyrificata (Heude, 1890)
 Sinotaia qionghaiensis Qian, Fang & He, 2014
 Sinotaia quadrata (Benson, 1842) - type species
 Sinotaia reevei (Dautzenberg & H. Fischer, 1905)
 Sinotaia turrita (Yen, 1939)
 Sinotaia xichangensis Qian, Fang & He, 2014

See also
 Bellamya

References

External links
 

Viviparidae